Feels Like Love may refer to:
 "Feels Like Love (Danger Danger song), 1989
 "Feels Like Love" (Vince Gill song), 2000
 "Feels Like Love" (La Toya Jackson song), 2014